The bourgeoisie is a social class, equivalent to the middle or upper class. They are distinguished from, and traditionally contrasted with, the proletariat by their affluence, and their great cultural and financial capital. They are sometimes divided into a petty, middle, large, upper, and ancient bourgeoisie and collectively designated as "the bourgeoisie". 

The bourgeoisie in its original sense is intimately linked to the existence of cities, recognized as such by their urban charters (e.g., municipal charters, town privileges, German town law), so there was no bourgeoisie apart from the citizenry of the cities. Rural peasants came under a different legal system.

In Marxist philosophy, the bourgeoisie is the social class that came to own the means of production during modern industrialization and whose societal concerns are the value of property and the preservation of capital to ensure the perpetuation of their economic supremacy in society.

Etymology

In the 18th century, before the French Revolution (1789–1799), in the French Ancien Régime, the masculine and feminine terms bourgeois and bourgeoise identified the relatively rich men and women who were members of the urban and rural Third Estate – the common people of the French realm, who violently deposed the absolute monarchy of the Bourbon King Louis XVI (r. 1774–1791), his clergy, and his aristocrats in the French Revolution of 1789–1799. Hence, since the 19th century, the term "bourgeoisie" usually is politically and sociologically synonymous with the ruling upper class of a capitalist society. In English, the word "bourgeoisie", as a term referring to French history, refers to a social class oriented to economic materialism and hedonism, and to upholding the political and economic interests of the capitalist ruling-class.

Historically, the medieval French word bourgeois denoted the inhabitants of the bourgs (walled market-towns), the craftsmen, artisans, merchants, and others, who constituted "the bourgeoisie". They were the socio-economic class between the peasants and the landlords, between the workers and the owners of the means of production. As the economic managers of the (raw) materials, the goods, and the services, and thus the capital (money) produced by the feudal economy, the term "bourgeoisie" evolved to also denote the middle class – the businessmen and businesswomen who accumulated, administered, and controlled the capital that made possible the development of the bourgs into cities.

Contemporarily, the terms "bourgeoisie" and "bourgeois" (noun) identify the ruling class in capitalist societies, as a social stratum; while "bourgeois" (adjective / noun modifier) describes the Weltanschauung (worldview) of men and women whose way of thinking is socially and culturally determined by their economic materialism and philistinism, a social identity famously mocked in Molière's comedy Le Bourgeois gentilhomme (1670), which satirizes buying the trappings of a noble-birth identity as the means of climbing the social ladder. The 18th century saw a partial rehabilitation of bourgeois values in genres such as the drame bourgeois (bourgeois drama) and "bourgeois tragedy".

Emerging in the 1970s, the shortened term "bougie" became slang, referring to things or attitutudes which are middle class, pretentious and suburban. In 2016, a hip-hop group Migos produced a song Bad and Boujee, featuring an intentional misspelling of the word as "boujee" – a term which has particularly been used by African Americans in reference to African Americans. The term refers to a person of lower or middle class doing pretentious activities or virtue signalling as an affectation of the upper-class.

History

Origins and rise 

The bourgeoisie emerged as a historical and political phenomenon in the 11th century when the bourgs of Central and Western Europe developed into cities dedicated to commerce and crafts. This urban expansion was possible thanks to economic concentration due to the appearance of protective self-organisation into guilds. Guilds arose when individual businessmen (such as craftsmen, artisans and merchants) conflicted with their rent-seeking feudal landlords who demanded greater rents than previously agreed.

In the event, by the end of the Middle Ages (c. AD 1500), under regimes of the early national monarchies of Western Europe, the bourgeoisie acted in self-interest, and politically supported the king or queen against legal and financial disorder caused by the greed of the feudal lords. In the late-16th and early 17th centuries, the bourgeoisies of England and the Netherlands had become the financial – thus political – forces that deposed the feudal order; economic power had vanquished military power in the realm of politics.

From progress to reaction (Marxist view)
According to the Marxist view of history, during the 17th and 18th centuries, the bourgeoisie were the politically progressive social class who supported the principles of constitutional government and of natural right, against the Law of Privilege and the claims of rule by divine right that the nobles and prelates had autonomously exercised during the feudal order.

The English Civil War (1642–1651), the American War of Independence (1775–1783), and French Revolution (1789–1799) were partly motivated by the desire of the bourgeoisie to rid themselves of the feudal and royal encroachments on their personal liberty, commercial prospects, and the ownership of property. In the 19th century, the bourgeoisie propounded liberalism, and gained political rights, religious rights, and civil liberties for themselves and the lower social classes; thus the bourgeoisie was a progressive philosophic and political force in Western societies.

After the Industrial Revolution (1750–1850), by the mid-19th century the great expansion of the bourgeoisie social class caused its stratification – by business activity and by economic function – into the haute bourgeoisie (bankers and industrialists) and the petite bourgeoisie (tradesmen and white-collar workers). Moreover, by the end of the 19th century, the capitalists (the original bourgeoisie) had ascended to the upper class, while the developments of technology and technical occupations allowed the rise of working-class men and women to the lower strata of the bourgeoisie; yet the social progress was incidental.

Denotations

Marxist theory 

According to Karl Marx, the bourgeois during the Middle Ages usually was a self-employed businessman – such as a merchant, banker, or entrepreneur – whose economic role in society was being the financial intermediary to the feudal landlord and the peasant who worked the fief, the land of the lord. Yet, by the 18th century, the time of the Industrial Revolution (1750–1850) and of industrial capitalism, the bourgeoisie had become the economic ruling class who owned the means of production (capital and land), and who controlled the means of coercion (armed forces and legal system, police forces and prison system).

In such a society, the bourgeoisie's ownership of the means of production allowed them to employ and exploit the wage-earning working class (urban and rural), people whose only economic means is labour; and the bourgeois control of the means of coercion suppressed the sociopolitical challenges by the lower classes, and so preserved the economic status quo; workers remained workers, and employers remained employers.

In the 19th century, Marx distinguished two types of bourgeois capitalist: (i) the functional capitalists, who are business administrators of the means of production; and (ii) rentier capitalists whose livelihoods derive either from the rent of property or from the interest-income produced by finance capital, or both. In the course of economic relations, the working class and the bourgeoisie continually engage in class struggle, where the capitalists exploit the workers, while the workers resist their economic exploitation, which occurs because the worker owns no means of production, and, to earn a living, seeks employment from the bourgeois capitalist; the worker produces goods and services that are property of the employer, who sells them for a price.

Besides describing the social class who owns the means of production, the Marxist use of the term "bourgeois" also describes the consumerist style of life derived from the ownership of capital and real property. Marx acknowledged the bourgeois industriousness that created wealth, but criticised the moral hypocrisy of the bourgeoisie when they ignored the alleged origins of their wealth: the exploitation of the proletariat, the urban and rural workers. Further sense denotations of "bourgeois" describe ideological concepts such as "bourgeois freedom", which is thought to be opposed to substantive forms of freedom; "bourgeois independence"; "bourgeois personal individuality"; the "bourgeois family"; et cetera, all derived from owning capital and property (see The Communist Manifesto, 1848).

France and French-speaking countries
In English, the term bourgeoisie is often used to denote the middle classes. In fact, the French term encompasses both the upper and middle economic classes, a misunderstanding which has occurred in other languages as well. The bourgeoisie in France and many French-speaking countries consists of five evolving social layers: petite bourgeoisie, moyenne bourgeoisie, grande bourgeoisie, haute bourgeoisie and ancienne bourgeoisie.

Petite bourgeoisie

The petite bourgeoisie is the equivalent of the modern-day middle class, or refers to "a social class between the middle class and the lower class: the lower middle class".

Moyenne bourgeoisie
The moyenne bourgeoisie or middle bourgeoisie contains people who have solid incomes and assets, but not the aura of those who have become established at a higher level. They tend to belong to a family that has been bourgeois for three or more generations. Some members of this class may have relatives from similar backgrounds, or may even have aristocratic connections. The moyenne bourgeoisie is the equivalent of the British and American upper-middle classes.

Grande bourgeoisie
The grande bourgeoisie are families that have been bourgeois since the 19th century, or for at least four or five generations.  Members of these families tend to marry with the aristocracy or make other advantageous marriages. This bourgeois family has acquired an established historical and cultural heritage over the decades. The names of these families are generally known in the city where they reside, and their ancestors have often contributed to the region's history. These families are respected and revered. They belong to the upper class, roughly equivalent to the British gentry. In the French-speaking countries, they are sometimes .

Haute bourgeoisie
The haute bourgeoisie is a social rank in the bourgeoisie that can only be acquired through time.

In France, it is composed of bourgeois families that have existed since the French Revolution. They hold only honourable professions and have experienced many illustrious marriages in their family's history. They have rich cultural and historical heritages, and their financial means are more than secure.

These families attempt to be perceived as nobles, taking on such affectations, for example, as avoiding certain marriages or occupations. They differ from nobility only in that because of circumstances, the lack of opportunity, and/or political regime, they have not been ennobled. These people nevertheless live lavishly, enjoying the company of the great artists of the time. In France, the families of the haute bourgeoisie are also referred to as les 200 familles, a term coined in the first half of the 20th century. Michel Pinçon and Monique Pinçon-Charlot studied the lifestyle of the French bourgeoisie, and how they boldly guard their world from the nouveau riche, or newly rich.

In the French language, the term bourgeoisie almost designates a caste by itself, even though social mobility into this socio-economic group is possible. Nevertheless, the bourgeoisie is differentiated from la classe moyenne, or the middle class, which consists mostly of white-collar employees, by holding a profession referred to as a profession libérale, which la classe moyenne, in its definition does not hold. Yet, in English the definition of a white-collar job encompasses the profession libérale.

Ancienne bourgeoisie
The ancienne bourgeoisie is a relatively recent sociological term coined by René Rémond and an additional subcategory in the French language to the "bourgeoisie" caste.

In Rémond's preface of "L’ancienne bourgeoisie en France : émergence et permanence d'un groupe social du xvie siècle au xxe siècle" published by Xavier de Montclos in 2013, he defines l’ancienne bourgeoisie as follows:

"An intermediary social group between the aristocracy and what we would call the middle classes ("les classes moyennes" in French, which does not have the same sociological implications as in English) and which was established between 15th and 16th centuries...These families are for the most part provincial dynasties whose social ascension was accomplished in their region of origin and to which they generally remain attached to, and in which their descendants are still present...These families are deeply rooted in the "Ancien Régime"...They have insured the transmission of their material legacy, as well their convictions and set of values for over 400 and 500 years". 

Xavier de Montclos goes further by saying that these families acquired their status during the "Ancien Régime", and that they belonged to the town's elite and the upper-crust of the "bourgeoisie" caste.

They usually acquired high and important administrative and judicial functions, and distinguished themselves through their success, particularly in business and industry. It was through this distinction that some of these families were able to acquire titles typically associated with the nobility, a caste from which they remained nonetheless excluded.

Nazism
Nazism rejected the Marxist concept of proletarian internationalism and class struggle, and supported the "class struggle between nations", and sought to resolve internal class struggle in the nation while it identified Germany as a proletariat nation fighting against plutocratic nations. The Nazi Party had many working-class supporters and members, and a strong appeal to the middle class. The financial collapse of the white collar middle-class of the 1920s figures much in their strong support of Nazism. In the poor country that was the Weimar Republic of the early 1930s, the Nazi Party realised their social policies with food and shelter for the unemployed and the homeless—who were later recruited into the Brownshirt Sturmabteilung (SA – Storm Detachments).

Adolf Hitler was impressed by the populist antisemitism and the anti-liberal bourgeois agitation of Karl Lueger, who as the mayor of Vienna during Hitler's time in the city, used a rabble-rousing style of oratory that appealed to the wider masses. When asked whether he supported the "bourgeois right-wing", Hitler claimed that Nazism was not exclusively for any class, and he also indicated that it favoured neither the left nor the right, but preserved "pure" elements from both "camps", stating: "From the camp of bourgeois tradition, it takes national resolve, and from the materialism of the Marxist dogma, living, creative Socialism."

Hitler distrusted capitalism for being unreliable due to its egotism, and he preferred a state-directed economy that is subordinated to the interests of the Volk. Hitler told a party leader in 1934, "The economic system of our day is the creation of the Jews." Hitler said to Benito Mussolini that capitalism had "run its course". Hitler also said that the business bourgeoisie "know nothing except their profit. 'Fatherland' is only a word for them." Hitler was personally disgusted with the ruling bourgeois elites of Germany during the period of the Weimar Republic, whom he referred to as "cowardly shits".

Modern history in Italy
Because of their ascribed cultural excellence as a social class, the Italian fascist régime (1922–45) of Prime Minister Benito Mussolini regarded the bourgeoisie as an obstacle to Modernism. Nonetheless, the Fascist State ideologically exploited the Italian bourgeoisie and their materialistic, middle-class spirit, for the more efficient cultural manipulation of the upper (aristocratic) and the lower (working) classes of Italy.

In 1938, Prime Minister Mussolini gave a speech wherein he established a clear ideological distinction between capitalism (the social function of the bourgeoisie) and the bourgeoisie (as a social class), whom he dehumanised by reducing them into high-level abstractions: a moral category and a state of mind. Culturally and philosophically, Mussolini isolated the bourgeoisie from Italian society by portraying them as social parasites upon the fascist Italian state and "The People"; as a social class who drained the human potential of Italian society, in general, and of the working class, in particular; as exploiters who victimised the Italian nation with an approach to life characterised by hedonism and materialism. Nevertheless, despite the slogan The Fascist Man Disdains the ″Comfortable″ Life, which epitomised the anti-bourgeois principle, in its final years of power, for mutual benefit and profit, the Mussolini fascist régime transcended ideology to merge the political and financial interests of Prime Minister Benito Mussolini with the political and financial interests of the bourgeoisie, the Catholic social circles who constituted the ruling class of Italy.

Philosophically, as a materialist creature, the bourgeois man was stereotyped as irreligious; thus, to establish an existential distinction between the supernatural faith of the Roman Catholic Church and the materialist faith of temporal religion; in The Autarchy of Culture: Intellectuals and Fascism in the 1930s, the priest Giuseppe Marino said that:

Culturally, the bourgeois man may be considered effeminate, infantile, or acting in a pretentious manner; describing his philistinism in Bonifica antiborghese (1939), Roberto Paravese comments on the:

The economic security, financial freedom, and social mobility of the bourgeoisie threatened the philosophic integrity of Italian Fascism, the ideological monolith that was the régime of Prime Minister Benito Mussolini. Any assumption of legitimate political power (government and rule) by the bourgeoisie represented a fascist loss of totalitarian state power for social control through political unity—one people, one nation, and one leader. Sociologically, to the fascist man, to become a bourgeois was a character flaw inherent to the masculine mystique; therefore, the ideology of Italian fascism scornfully defined the bourgeois man as "spiritually castrated".

Bourgeois culture

Cultural hegemony 
Karl Marx said that the culture of a society is dominated by the mores of the ruling-class, wherein their superimposed value system is abided by each social class (the upper, the middle, the lower) regardless of the socio-economic results it yields to them. In that sense, contemporary societies are bourgeois to the degree that they practice the mores of the small-business "shop culture" of early modern France; which the writer Émile Zola (1840–1902) naturalistically presented, analysed, and ridiculed in the twenty-two-novel series (1871–1893) about Les Rougon-Macquart family; the thematic thrust is the necessity for social progress, by subordinating the economic sphere to the social sphere of life.

Conspicuous consumption 

The critical analyses of the bourgeois mentality by the German intellectual Walter Benjamin (1892–1940) indicated that the shop culture of the petite bourgeoisie established the sitting room as the centre of personal and family life; as such, the English bourgeois culture is, he alleges, a sitting-room culture of prestige through conspicuous consumption. The material culture of the bourgeoisie concentrated on mass-produced luxury goods of high quality; between generations, the only variance was the materials with which the goods were manufactured.

In the early part of the 19th century, the bourgeois house contained a home that first was stocked and decorated with hand-painted porcelain, machine-printed cotton fabrics, machine-printed wallpaper, and Sheffield steel (crucible and stainless). The utility of these things was inherent in their practical functions. By the latter part of the 19th century, the bourgeois house contained a home that had been remodelled by conspicuous consumption. Here, Benjamin argues, the goods were bought to display wealth (discretionary income), rather than for their practical utility. The bourgeoisie had transposed the wares of the shop window to the sitting room, where the clutter of display signalled bourgeois success (see Culture and Anarchy, 1869).

Two spatial constructs manifest the bourgeois mentality: (i) the shop-window display, and (ii) the sitting room. In English, the term "sitting-room culture" is synonymous for "bourgeois mentality", a "philistine" cultural perspective from the Victorian Era (1837–1901), especially characterised by the repression of emotion and of sexual desire; and by the construction of a regulated social-space where "propriety" is the key personality trait desired in men and women.

Nonetheless, from such a psychologically constricted worldview, regarding the rearing of children, contemporary sociologists claim to have identified "progressive" middle-class values, such as respect for non-conformity, self-direction, autonomy, gender equality and the encouragement of innovation; as in the Victorian Era, the transposition to the US of the bourgeois system of social values has been identified as a requisite for employment success in the professions. 

Bourgeois values are dependent on rationalism, which began with the economic sphere and moves into every sphere of life which is formulated by Max Weber. The beginning of rationalism is commonly called the Age of Reason. Much like the Marxist critics of that period, Weber was concerned with the growing ability of large corporations and nations to increase their power and reach throughout the world.

Satire and criticism in art 
Beyond the intellectual realms of political economy, history, and political science that discuss, describe, and analyse the bourgeoisie as a social class, the colloquial usage of the sociological terms bourgeois and bourgeoise describe the social stereotypes of the old money and of the nouveau riche, who is a politically timid conformist satisfied with a wealthy, consumerist style of life characterised by conspicuous consumption and the continual striving for prestige. This being the case, the cultures of the world describe the philistinism of the middle-class personality, produced by the excessively rich life of the bourgeoisie, is examined and analysed in comedic and dramatic plays, novels, and films (see Authenticity).

The term bourgeoisie has been used as a pejorative and a term of abuse since the 19th century, particularly by intellectuals and artists.

Theatre
Le Bourgeois gentilhomme (The Would-be Gentleman, 1670) by Molière (Jean-Baptiste Poquelin), is a comedy-ballet that satirises Monsieur Jourdain, the prototypical nouveau riche man who buys his way up the social-class scale, to realise his aspirations of becoming a gentleman, to which end he studies dancing, fencing, and philosophy, the trappings and accomplishments of a gentleman, to be able to pose as a man of noble birth, someone who, in 17th-century France, was a man to the manor born; Jourdain's self-transformation also requires managing the private life of his daughter, so that her marriage can also assist his social ascent.

Literature 

Buddenbrooks (1901), by Thomas Mann (1875–1955), chronicles the moral, intellectual, and physical decay of a rich family through its declines, material and spiritual, in the course of four generations, beginning with the patriarch Johann Buddenbrook Sr. and his son, Johann Buddenbrook Jr., who are typically successful German businessmen; each is a reasonable man of solid character.

Yet, in the children of Buddenbrook Jr., the materially comfortable style of life provided by the dedication to solid, middle-class values elicits decadence: The fickle daughter, Toni, lacks and does not seek a purpose in life; son Christian is honestly decadent, and lives the life of a ne'er-do-well; and the businessman son, Thomas, who assumes command of the Buddenbrook family fortune, occasionally falters from middle-class solidity by being interested in art and philosophy, the impractical life of the mind, which, to the bourgeoisie, is the epitome of social, moral, and material decadence.

Babbitt (1922), by Sinclair Lewis (1885–1951), satirizes the American bourgeois George Follansbee Babbitt, a middle-aged realtor, booster, and joiner in the Midwestern city of Zenith, who – despite being unimaginative, self-important, and hopelessly conformist and middle-class – is aware that there must be more to life than money and the consumption of the best things that money can buy. Nevertheless, he fears being excluded from the mainstream of society more than he does living for himself, by being true to himself – his heart-felt flirtations with independence (dabbling in liberal politics and a love affair with a pretty widow) come to naught because he is existentially afraid.

Yet, George F. Babbitt sublimates his desire for self-respect, and encourages his son to rebel against the conformity that results from bourgeois prosperity, by recommending that he be true to himself:

Films 
Many of the satirical films by the Spanish film director Luis Buñuel (1900–1983) examine the mental and moral effects of the bourgeois mentality, its culture, and the stylish way of life it provides for its practitioners.

 L'Âge d'or (The Golden Age, 1930) illustrates the madness and self-destructive hypocrisy of bourgeois society.
 Belle de Jour (Beauty of the day, 1967) tells the story of a bourgeois wife who is bored with her marriage and decides to prostitute herself.
 Le charme discret de la bourgeoisie (The Discreet Charm of the Bourgeoisie, 1972) explores the timidity instilled by middle-class values.
 Cet obscur objet du désir (That Obscure Object of Desire, 1977) illuminates the practical self-deceptions required for buying love as marriage.

See also

References

Works cited

Further reading
 Bledstein, Burton J. and Johnston, Robert D. (eds.) The Middling Sorts: Explorations in the History of the American Middle Class. Routledge. 2001.
 Brooks, David, Bobos In Paradise: The New Upper Class and How They Got There. Simon & Schuster. 2001.
 Byrne, Frank J. Becoming Bourgeois: Merchant Culture in the South, 1820–1865. University Press of Kentucky. 2006.
 Cousin, Bruno and Sébastien Chauvin (2021). "Is there a global super-bourgeoisie?" Sociology Compass, vol. 15, issue 6, pp. 1–15. online
Hunt, Margaret R. The Middling Sort: Commerce, Gender, and the Family in England, 1680–1780. University of California Press. 1996.
 Lockwood, David. Cronies or Capitalists? The Russian Bourgeoisie and the Bourgeois Revolution from 1850 to 1917. Cambridge Scholars Publishing. 2009.
 Siegel, Jerrold. Bohemian Paris: Culture, Politics, and the Boundaries of Bourgeois Life, 1830–1930. The Johns Hopkins University Press. 1999.
 Stern, Robert W. Changing India: Bourgeois Revolution on the Subcontinent. Cambridge University Press. 2nd edition, 2003.

External links 

The Democratic State – A Critique of Bourgeois Sovereignty

 
Marxist terminology
Sociology of culture
Middle class
Upper class
Estates (social groups)